Daniel Lucas Rowe (born 29 January 1989) is an English professional footballer who plays as a striker for Chesterfield.

Rowe played youth football for Preston North End and Manchester United, later playing for Blackpool Wren Rovers, Kendal Town, Fleetwood Town, Droylsden, Stockport County, Barrow, Lincoln City, AFC Fylde (where he is the all-time leading goalscorer), Oldham Athletic, Bradford City and Chesterfield.

Career

Early career
Born in Blackpool, Rowe played youth football with Preston North End before joining Manchester United as a 12-year-old in 2001 for a fee determined at tribunal that could potentially have reached a six-figure sum, however, he was released by United aged sixteen. He then began a joinery apprenticeship at a building site in Blackpool. Speaking to Sky Sports in 2020, he said he fell out of love with the sport after his release by United.

He began his senior career in non-league with Blackpool Wren Rovers, where he scored 63 goals in 68 games between August 2008 and August 2010. He also played Sunday league football for Quilligans.

He joined Kendal Town for whom he debuted in the club's 1–0 Northern Premier League at home to Frickley Athletic on 21 August 2010. He moved up two divisions four months later when he joined Fleetwood Town for an undisclosed fee. from whom he spent loan spells at Droylsden, Stockport County, and Barrow moving on to join Lincoln City.

AFC Fylde
On 8 August 2014, Rowe joined Conference North side AFC Fylde after featuring for the club during pre-season. During his third season at the club, Rowe scored fifty goals in all competitions as Fylde won promotion to the National League, his fiftieth and final goal coming on a final day 4–2 victory over Worcester City, these efforts securing him the league's Player of the Year award, as well as the club's Player of the Season, Goal of the Season, Golden Boot and Players' Player of the Season awards. He also won the Player of the Year award for both the 2017–18 and 2018–19 seasons. Rowe scored the only goal of the game as Fylde defeated Leyton Orient to lift the FA Trophy. He asked to leave Fylde in January 2020, with the club putting him on the transfer list. He later said that he wished to play in the Football League but realise that would not be possible with Fylde. He departed Fylde as their all-time leading goalscorer.

Oldham Athletic
He moved to Oldham Athletic later that month for an undisclosed fee, signing an 18-month contract. He made his debut for the club on 18 January 2020, coming off of the bench in a 1–1 draw with Carlisle United. He scored his first goal for the club the following week, in his first start for the club. In November 2020, Rowe's 35 yard free kick won the league's goal of the month award.

Bradford City
In January 2021 he moved to Bradford City, signing an 18-month contract with the club for an undisclosed fee. Interim club manager Conor Sellars described Rowe as "exciting" and said that he could help the club score more goals.

Rowe made his debut for the club on 23 January in a 0–0 draw with Cambridge United, and scored his first goal for the club in a 3–1 victory at Southend United three days later. After 2 goals in 3 games he was ruled out due to a heavy cold.

Chesterfield
On 22 April 2021 he moved to Chesterfield after spending 3 months with Bradford City. Bradford City later said they had no regrets about Rowe's short stay with the club. He made his debut two days later in a 0–0 draw with Wrexham, taking 6 matches to score his first goal, grabbing the fourth in a 4–1 thrashing of King's Lynn Town. In the penultimate match of the season, Rowe scored a vital double as Chesterfield beat Dagenham & Redbridge 2–1 to keep Chesterfield in the play-offs, a position they remained in after the season's conclusion.

AFC Fylde (loan)
On 23 August 2022, Rowe returned to AFC Fylde on loan until 1 January 2023.

Career statistics

Honours

Club
AFC Fylde
National League North: 2016–17
FA Trophy: 2018–19

Individual
AFC Fylde Player of the Season: 2015–16, 2016–17
AFC Fylde Goal of the Season: 2015–16, 2016–17
AFC Fylde Players' Player of the Season: 2016–17
National League North Player of the Season: 2017–18
Blue Square Bet North Player of the Month: November 2011
National League North Player of the Month: March 2016, August 2016, September 2016
National League Player of the Month: November 2017
National League Player of the Season: 2017–18, 2018–19
League Two Goal of the Month: November 2020

References

1989 births
Living people
Sportspeople from Blackpool
English footballers
Association football forwards
Preston North End F.C. players
Manchester United F.C. players
Blackpool Wren Rovers F.C. players
Kendal Town F.C. players
Fleetwood Town F.C. players
Droylsden F.C. players
Stockport County F.C. players
Barrow A.F.C. players
Lincoln City F.C. players
AFC Fylde players
Oldham Athletic A.F.C. players
Bradford City A.F.C. players
Chesterfield F.C. players
Northern Premier League players
National League (English football) players
English Football League players